Anolis cuvieri (Vernacular Spanish: lagarto verde, lagarto chipojo; Vernacular English: Puerto Rican giant anole, Cuvier's anole, green giant anole.) is a species of lizard in the family Dactyloidae. The species is endemic to Puerto Rico, and is common in the Toro Negro State Forest.

Etymology
The specific name, cuvieri, is in honor of French naturalist Georges Cuvier.

Description
It has a large, robust skull and long hind legs, as well as a serrated ridge of raised scales along its back. Like most anoles, this species has large flattened disks under the second and third phalanges of each toe which enable it to adhere to vertical surfaces. This species is predominantly green in body coloration with some individuals displaying faint light green stripes on the sides and dorsal surface.

In some specimens, particularly large adult males, the head is heavily blotched with sky blue coloration which suffuses onto the nape. This coloration may extend onto the neck area or even onto the dorsal surface running the length of the spine. In females where the blue coloration is present it is only as a sky blue tint on the head which does not extend onto the neck.

In both males and females the orbital area is either bright yellow or vibrant yellow-green. Both male and female Puerto Rican giant anoles possess a large dewlap; however, it is noticeably larger and colored bright yellow in males whereas in females it is light green with a blue green superior portion and faint black stripes running horizontally across the upper two thirds. The coloration of A. cuvieri is ontogenic, with juveniles of both sexes being gray brown or brown in color with brown vertical stripes running along the entire dorsal surface of the body as well as the limbs. As they mature, juveniles gradually acquire the green adult coloration. There also exists a rare brown adult morph of A. cuvieri which is solid brown in body coloration with black spots on the sides and neck and a yellow blotched orbital area. Both sexes possess a large erectile crest on the tail, though it is usually higher in males.

Habitat
A. cuvieri belongs to a group of anoles known as crown giants, these are large species which inhabit the uppermost canopy of tall trees and rarely descend to ground level. A. cuvieri is only found in intact forest regions where large quantities of large trees are present. They are typically active several meters above the ground and are found mainly in palm, Ficus, and other large trees. This species locomotes by jumping from branch to branch within the canopy, a lifestyle for which it has evolved long hind limbs. It is a mesic species, preferring areas of wet forest over more xeric conditions, where it is rarely found.

Diet
Like all anoles, A. cuvieri is primarily insectivorous, feeding on arboreal insects such as large beetles and lepidopterans. This species is also an opportunist species, and its robust skull and powerful bite allow it to take a wide range of prey including other anoles, juveniles of its own species and small birds as well as large snails and occasionally fruit.

Behaviour
Both sexes of A. cuvieri are extremely territorial and aggressive. Males, however, are particularly aggressive not only towards other males but also towards any organism or object that the anole perceives to be a threat. Males that encounter intruders in their territory will generally perform elaborate bodily displays, extending and recoiling the dewlap and performing various head bobs or pushups. This is usually done well before the intruder manages to get within close proximity of the defender and the display is often successful at warding off the intruder. However, if the intruding male is persistent then a fight may ensue with the males locking jaws and biting at each other's extremities until either male either gives up and flees or dies of exhaustion. Fights may also prove fatal if a serious wound, such as an amputated limb, occurs and subsequently becomes infected. This species attempts to bite when handled and its powerful jaws are capable of breaking skin. It may also display at a potential predator or captor if one is sighted. Like many reptiles the mouth of this species harbors Salmonella and an infection may occur if a bite breaks the skin.

Threat and conservation
A. cuvieri is currently under threat in Puerto Rico due to the effects of past deforestation and environmental degradation. It is now only found in a select few areas of intact natural forest but its population appears to be stable. During Puerto Rico's period of rampant deforestation in the early twentieth century this species disappeared almost entirely and was not sighted for many years. It was feared extinct until after the agricultural collapse in Puerto Rico (late 1950s) which resulted in an end to deforestation. After this, the species made a remarkable recovery and, though its distribution is still limited, it has become quite common in some of the remaining areas of natural rainforest on the island.

Gallery

See also

List of amphibians and reptiles of Puerto Rico
Fauna of Puerto Rico
List of endemic fauna of Puerto Rico

References

Further reading
Boulenger GA (1885). Catalogue of the Lizards in the British Museum (Natural History). Second Edition. Volume II. Iguanidæ ... London: Trustees of the British Museum (Natural History). (Taylor and Francis, printers). xiii + 497 pp. + Plates I-XXIV. (Anolis cuvieri, pp. 23–24).
Merrem B (1820). Versuch eines Systems der Amphibien: Tentamen Systematis Amphibiorum. Marburg: J.C. Krieger. xv + 191 pp. + one plate. (Anolis cuvieri, new species, p. 45). (in German and Latin).
Schwartz A, Thomas R (1975). A Check-list of West Indian Amphibians and Reptiles. Carnegie Museum of Natural History Special Publication No. 1. Pittsburgh, Pennsylvania: Carnegie Museum of Natural History. 216 pp. (Anolis cuvieri, p. 76).

External links
Anolis cuvieri. Puerto Rico Gap Analysis.

Anoles
Lizards of the Caribbean
Endemic fauna of Puerto Rico
Reptiles of Puerto Rico
Reptiles described in 1820
Taxa named by Blasius Merrem